In mathematics, the Poincaré–Bendixson theorem is a statement about the long-term behaviour of orbits of continuous dynamical systems on the plane, cylinder, or two-sphere.

Theorem
Given a differentiable real dynamical system defined on an open subset of the plane, every non-empty compact ω-limit set of an orbit, which contains only finitely many fixed points, is either
 a fixed point,
 a periodic orbit, or
 a connected set composed of a finite number of fixed points together with homoclinic and heteroclinic orbits connecting these.

Moreover, there is at most one orbit connecting different fixed points in the same direction. However, there could be countably many homoclinic orbits connecting one fixed point.

Discussion 
The condition that the dynamical system be on the plane is necessary to the theorem. On a torus, for example, it is possible to have a recurrent non-periodic orbit.
In particular, chaotic behaviour can only arise in continuous dynamical systems whose phase space has three or more dimensions. However the theorem does not apply to discrete dynamical systems, where chaotic behaviour can arise in two- or even one-dimensional systems.

Applications
One important implication is that a two-dimensional continuous dynamical system cannot give rise to a strange attractor. If a strange attractor C did exist in such a system, then it could be enclosed in a closed and bounded subset of the phase space. By making this subset small enough, any nearby stationary points could be excluded. But then the Poincaré–Bendixson theorem says that C is not a strange attractor at all—it is either a limit cycle or it converges to a limit cycle.

See also
 Rotation number

References

Theorems in dynamical systems